William Arthur Grant Luckman  (25 June 1857 – 8 January 1921) was Archdeacon of Calcutta from 1907 to 1911.

Luckman was educated at Keble College, Oxford and         ordained in 1881. He was a Master at the   Boys’ High School, Allahabad from 1882 to 1886; Chaplain of St Paul's Cathedral, Calcutta from 1896 to 1893; the Incumbent at St John, Calcutta from 1893 to 1895; and a Canon at St Paul's from 1895 to 1907. After his time as Archdeacon he was the Minister of St Cuthbert, Edinburgh until his death.

References

Alumni of Keble College, Oxford
Archdeacons of Calcutta
1857 births
1921 deaths